Mirebalais is an arrondissement in the Centre department of Haiti. As of 2015, the population was 192,852 inhabitants. Postal codes in the Mirebalais Arrondissement start with the number 52.

The arondissement consists of the following communes:
 Mirebalais
 Saut-d'Eau
 Boucan-Carré

References

Arrondissements of Haiti
Centre (department)